Victoria South was a federal electoral district represented in the House of Commons of Canada from 1867 to 1904. It was located in the province of Ontario. It was created by the British North America Act of 1867, which divided the County of Victoria divided into two ridings, the South and North Ridings. The South Riding consisted of the Townships of Ops, Mariposa, Emily, Verulam, and the Town of Lindsay.

The electoral district was abolished in 1903 when it was amalgamated into Victoria riding.

Electoral history

|- 
  
|Liberal
|George Kempt  
|align="right"| 1,001 
 
|Unknown
|Hector Cameron
|align="right"|801   
|}

|- 
  
|Conservative
|DORMER, George
|align="right"| 1,228 
 
|Unknown
|  MCLENNAN, 
|align="right"| 1,070
|}

|- 
  
|Conservative
|MCQUADE, Arthur
|align="right"|1,292 
 
|Unknown
|MCLENNAN, J. 
|align="right"|1,223 
|}

|- 
  
|Conservative
|MCQUADE, Arthur 
|align="right"|1,705
 
|Unknown
|CONNOLLY, J. 
|align="right"|1,281  
|}

|- 
  
|Conservative
|DUNDAS, Joseph R.
|align="right"| 1,577 
 
|Unknown
|NEEDLAR, William 
|align="right"|1,517 
|}

|- 
  
|Conservative
|HUDSPETH, Adam 
|align="right"| 1,914 
  
|Liberal
|LOUNSBOROUGH, Wm. 
|align="right"| 1,867   
|}

|- 
  
|Conservative
|HUDSPETH, Adam
|align="right"| 1,927
  
|Liberal
|NEEDLER, William  
|align="right"|1,873   
|}

|- 
  
|Liberal-Conservative
|FAIRBAIRN, Charles
|align="right"|  acclaimed    
|}

|- 
  
|Liberal-Conservative
|FAIRBAIRN, Charles  
|align="right"| 2,055   
  
|Liberal
| WALTERS, Thomas 
|align="right"|2,030    
|}

|- 
  
|Liberal-Conservative
|FAIRBAIRN, Charles  
|align="right"| acclaimed   
|}

|- 
  
|Liberal
|MCHUGH, Geo.  
|align="right"| 2,051
  
|Conservative
|VROOMAN, Adam E.  
|align="right"| 1,989    
|}

|- 
  
|Conservative
|VROOMAN, Adam Edward
|align="right"| 2,337 
  
|Liberal
|MCHUGH, George  
|align="right"| 2,121   
|}

See also 

 List of Canadian federal electoral districts
 Past Canadian electoral districts

External links 

 Website of the Parliament of Canada

Former federal electoral districts of Ontario